Praeepischnia nevadensis is a species of snout moth. It is found in Spain.

The length of the forewings is 11.5–13 mm.

References

Moths described in 1910
Phycitini